is a district of Shinagawa, Tokyo, Japan. The current administrative place names are Yashio 1-chome to Yashio 5-chome. It is an area where the residential address has been displayed. It corresponds to the area on the north side of Ōi Wharf Part 1. The south side of Ōi Wharf 1 is Tokai, Ōta, Tokyo.

Education
Shinagawa City Board of Education operates public elementary and junior high schools.

Yashio 1-3 chome are zoned to Jonan No. 2 Elementary School (城南第二小学校) and Tokai Junior High School (東海中学校). 4-5 chome are zoned to Yashio Gakuen (八潮学園) for both elementary and junior high school.

References

External links

Districts of Shinagawa